Taiwan Center for Mandarin Learning is a project initiated and funded by the government of the Republic of China (Taiwan) to establish learning centres in foreign countries to teach students Mandarin Chinese with "Taiwanese characteristics". The project was announced in June 2021 with plans to establish 20 centres in various places in the United States and Europe.

Background 
Confucius Institutes (CIs) are a program promoted by the government of the People's Republic of China (PRC) to spread Chinese language learning and culture overseas, including in the United States. They have been criticized as being political tools of the government of China to promote the official views of the PRC and suppress alternative views. The US government has labeled CIs as a foreign mission and cut government funding to universities that host them. In December 2020, the US government announced a partnership with Taiwan called the "U.S.-Taiwan Education Initiative" in order to help Taiwan promote Mandarin learning in the United States and around the world.

BBC News reported that the US government is giving preference to Mandarin learning facilitated by Taiwan rather than by the PRC as the former has "no strings attached".

Centers
The program was launched in June 2021. As of 2023, a total of 66 centers have been established, with 54 in the United States and 12 in Europe (2 each in the U.K., France and Germany, and 1 each in Austria, Belgium, Czech Republic, Hungary, Ireland, and Sweden).

See also 
 Criticism of Confucius Institutes
 Taiwan Academy

References

External links 
 Taiwan Center for Mandarin Learning
 List of Taiwan Centers for Mandarin Learning
 English language version of the ROC policy to establish centres

Chinese-language schools
Cultural promotion organizations
Foreign relations of Taiwan
Mandarin Chinese
Taiwanese culture